Day labor (or day labour in Commonwealth spelling) is work done where the worker is hired and paid one day at a time, with no promise that more work will be available in the future. It is a form of contingent work.

Types

Day laborers (also known archaically as daysmen) find work through three common routes.

Firstly, some employment agencies specialize in very short-term contracts for manual labor most often in construction, factories, offices, and manufacturing. These companies usually have offices where workers can arrive and be assigned to a job on the spot, as they are available.

Secondly, a manager looking for additional labor to fill an unexpected change in plans is presented with a problem of finding the needed quantity of labor with the right skills. Imagine the magnitude of the task of looking for workers, on the side of the street or by calling various employment agencies, who can verify that they are journeyman asphalt rakers, typists, programmers, etc. The benefit of representation is applied to both the labor and employer. Labor is given a source of recourse to achieve a safe work environment free of favoritism and arbitrary work assignments. Employers benefit from organized labor training programs, benefit plans, dispute resolution and a labor supply meeting most employers labor demand at most any time or place. The benefit of a labor supply arriving at a specified time and location within less than a day's notice is reduced overhead resources.

Thirdly and less formally, workers meet at well-known locations, usually public street corners or commercial parking lots, and wait for building contractors, landscapers, home owners and small business owners, and other potential employers to offer work. Much of this work is in small residential construction or landscaping. These workers earn, on average, $8–$10 an hour. The media and a study by UCLA portrays day laborers as being illegal immigrants from Mexico and Central America,  who otherwise can't get work due to current employment regulations. Other research has found that day laborers are not typically illegal immigrants, many even being citizens of the US, and that day labor is often a transition to full-time work.

Day labor in the United States
Informal day labor is not new to the United States, and day laborers are not always migrant workers in many cases. In his study of day laborers in Atlanta, Terry Easton interviews white and black day laborers in addition to Hispanic workers. Many other metropolitan areas still have non-immigrant day laborers, and many other large and small cities have immigrant day laborers from a variety of countries, including Mongolia, Poland, Russia, Brazil, Central and South America, and countries in Africa. Non-immigrant informal day labor, seen in many cities, does not generate the controversy or calls to police and local government seen when immigrant day laborers gather to wait for work.

Unorganized day labor creates real problems for day laborers: 1 in 3 corner day laborers have experienced theft of wages in the past two months; 1 in 5 experienced a serious worksite injury in the past year. Low wages and poor working conditions, employer abuse, and lack of insurance for work related accidents is common.

Numerous complaints are made about immigrant day laborers. These include loitering, noise, crime and rushing cars of potential employers in parking lots. Cities and counties have tried a variety of solutions with varied success. Some municipalities and communities have supported workers' efforts to organize themselves into democratically run workers' centers, designated areas, and organizations to defend workers' rights in general. Workers' Centers of this kind date back at least 18 years to Los Angeles.  Other municipalities have targeted day labor sites for aggressive enforcement of immigration laws.

Though united in their commitment to the rights of immigrant workers, NDLON and the Day Labor Research Institute represent two very different models of day labor center. NDLON represents the "social service agency model" and the Institute the "day laborer designed model." These different models of day labor centers may yield markedly different results that reflect the different goals of each model.

Problems when workers' centers are established are also common: day laborers often continue to congregate in large numbers on the streets surrounding the day labor centers, refusing to leave the street and use the center; new problems can be created, including new crowds of homeless and substance abusers loitering near the center after hours, and large numbers of day laborers drawn from other areas to the streets surrounding the centers. Low levels of work at the centers, low wages, and problems with the job distribution system are also common.

See also
 Temporary work
 Peon

References

Further reading
Odem, Mary. "Global Lives, Local Struggles: Latin American Immigrants in Atlanta." Southern Spaces, May 19, 2006. http://southernspaces.org/2006/global-lives-local-struggles-latin-american-immigrants-atlanta
Sanchez, George. "Latinos, the American South, and the Future of U.S. Race Relations." Southern Spaces, April 26, 2007. http://southernspaces.org/2007/latinos-american-south-and-future-us-race-relations
Svensson, Lynn. Comparing Solutions: An Overview of Day Labor Programs. Day Labor Research Institute, August, 2004.
Foster, Meghan. Failing to Deliver: One-Stop Employment Centers. Day Labor/Jobs Project of the Chicago Coalition for the Homeless, 2004
Torres, Gustavo. From Services to Activism: How Latino Day Laborers and Domestic Workers are Advocating for Themselves. From Services to Activism: How Latino Day Laborers and Domestic Workers are Advocating for Themselves, NYU/Wagner, Leadership for a Changing World, Research and Documentation Component, Research Center for Leadership in Action, September, 2003.

External links

Organizations
 Public Architecture's Day Labor Station
 Library Service to Day Laborers: Biblio/webliography
 Casa Latina
 Issue Lab: Day Labor
 Day Labor Research Institute

In film and television
 PBS The Workers documentary
 PBS Farmingville documentary
 Day Labor, a short comedy satirizing corporate America through the experience of two laborers
 The Job, an award-winning comic short

Labor relations